The eleventh Sarawak state election was held on Saturday, 7 May 2016 after nomination for candidates on Monday, 25 April 2016. The 82 members of the Sarawak State Legislative Assembly, were elected in single-member constituencies using first-past-the-post voting. More than 1.1 million who had their names entered or retained in an electoral register for a particular electoral district in Sarawak was eligible to vote at the time of the election. Malaysia does not practice compulsory voting and automatic voter registration. The voting age is 21 although the age of majority in the country is 18. The election was conducted by the Election Commission of Malaysia.

The Sarawak State Legislative Assembly would automatically dissolve on 20 June 2016, the fifth anniversary of the first sitting, and elections must be held within sixty days of the dissolution (on or before 19 August 2016, with the date to be decided by the Election Commission), unless dissolved prior to that date by the Yang di-Pertua Negeri of Sarawak on the advice of the Chief Minister of Sarawak.

The previous state election was held at 2011. The state assemblymen is elected to 5 years term each. It is expected to be the most hotly contested election in Sarawak's poll history. At the previous election, the opposition coalition Pakatan Rakyat made historic gains by doubling its State Assembly seats, while the ruling coalition Barisan Nasional retained a two-thirds majority.

The incumbent Chief Minister Adenan Satem first announced the election during a party branch meeting on 29 January, speculating 18 April as the nomination day and 30 April as election day. However, Adenan said the final decision was up to the Election Commission.

On 14 April, the Election Commission announced that the election will be held on 7 May, with 12 days of campaigning and the nomination day set on 25 April. The legislative assembly was dissolved on Monday, 11 April.

Timeline

Proposed Sarawak electoral districts
A proposal by the Election Commission to increase the number of state seats from 71 to 82 was challenged in the High Court and nullified.  However this was overturned by the Court of Appeal reasoning that the increase in seats would not breach voters' constitutional rights and was in accordance with the 13th Schedule of the Federal Constitution.

The composition of seats by ethnic majority consists of 22 Dayak-Iban majority seats, 17 Muslim-Malay majority seats, 16 Chinese-majority seats, 9 Melanau-majority seats, 8 Dayak-Bidayuh majority seats, 6 Dayak-Orang Ulu majority seats, 2 Kedayan-majority seats, and 2 Brunei-Malay majority seats.

Political parties

Campaign

The Sarawak state government was alleged to have abused their power, by banning several opposition MPs and members from entering the state during campaigning, as under Section 67 of the Immigration Act, a person cannot be denied entry into Sarawak if the visit was “for the sole purpose of engaging in legitimate political activity”.  Opposition leaders like Lim Guan Eng and Azmin Ali were allowed into the state on a temporary basis to campaign during the election period but were told to leave after five days. Both Barisan Nasional and the opposition engaged in online Youtube videos platforms to reach out to voters. Both Barisan Nasional and the opposition conveyed the "state nationalism" message through different ways. Barisan emphasized on voting on local parties to ensure the rights of the Sarawakians are preserved from cultural influence from Peninsular Malaysia while providing a vision of better living in urban centres. Meanwhile, the opposition parties emphasized that all their candidates are sourced locally. The opposition, by showing images or videos regarding the harsh life or rural dwellers in Sarawak, alleged that the federal government has been neglecting the infrastructure development in Sarawak for years.

Barisan Nasional
Breakaway parties such as TERAS and UPP, with 5 and 4 seats respectively prior to the dissolution of the state assembly, have their members contested seats under the Barisan banner as direct election candidates under a deal by Adenan Satem after their parties were prevented from joining Barisan after opposition from parties such as SUPP and SPDP. Candidates from Barisan have been seen handing out money, foodstuffs and other election goodies to potential voters. The government is also trying to tie the election to the development of the state such as upgrading roads and building the Pan-Borneo Highway.

Pakatan Harapan
Due to disagreements in contesting several seats between both DAP and PKR, both parties would be facing each other and Barisan in 6 multi-cornered fights in Batu Kitang, Mulu, Murum, Simanggang, Ngemah and Mambong. A DAP candidate had brought up the issue of minimum wage being lower in Sarawak compared to Peninsula Malaysia and that many younger Sarawakians were migrating to Peninsula Malaysia and Singapore for better job opportunities.

Electoral candidates

Results 

Two seats were won by Barisan Nasional uncontested, which are Bukit Kota and Bukit Sari.

Seats changing party

Election pendulums

Government formation
Adenan Satem formed the state cabinet after being invited by Abdul Taib Mahmud to begin a new government following 7 May 2016 state election in Sarawak. To be the Chief Minister, Adenan sworn in before the Yang di-Pertua Negeri at 10.00 p.m. Malaysia Standard Time on 7 May 2016 at The Astana, Sarawak.

Notes

References

External links
 11th Sarawak State Election | Sarawak Info ~ Sarawak Information Portal
 myUNDI Sarawak

 
Sarawak state elections
Sarawak